Going to America is a 2014 American black comedy film written and directed by Param Gill set to release nationwide in AMC theaters on 28 August 2015. The film toured the festival circuit under the title of Last Supper and won numerous awards. The film received favorable reviews from critics with Atlas and Aeris independent film magazine calling director Param Gill as the next big independent filmmaker in Hollywood. The film stars Eddie Griffin, Josh Meyers, Najarra Townsend, Dave Vescio and Penny Marshall. It is about two lunatics who escape a mental institution to make a film. It was the opening night film at 22nd annual San Francisco Global Movie Festival on August 15, 2014.
The Film swept the Festival with wins in five categories including Best Director for Param Gill with a cash award of $100,000.

Synopsis

Going to America is about two romantic and ambitious lunatics, Fumnanya (Eddie Griffin) and Andy (Josh Meyers) who escape a mental institution with a video camera and set out to make a movie about their romantic quest to find a princess and be rewarded with a magical kiss. The duo encounters various obstacles, not the least of which is that their 'princess' turns out to be a burned-out prostitute (Najarra Townsend) who wants to commit suicide. She enlists Fumnanya and Andy to help her, only to have her suicide plans turn out to be a disaster and her pimp Rocco (Dave Vescio) emerge as a menacing threat. But along the way, the trio ends up becoming overnight sensations on YouTube, as followers speculate whether the whole thing is a clever hoax or a moving if unorthodox attempt at redemption.

Awards

Principal cast

Development and production
The film was loosely adapted from an original Slovenian film which was the biggest box office hit in the history of Slovenian Cinema.
Lindsay Lohan was originally asked to play the role of Candy but the role eventually went to Najarra Townsend.
Penny Marshall has a cameo and plays herself.

Reception
The initial trailer was released on June 23, 2014 to a mixed response.

References

External links

2014 films
American black comedy films
2010s English-language films
2010s American films